Pinaki & Happy - The Bhoot Bandhus is an Indian animated television series directed by Naresh Soni and premiered on the Nickelodeon Sonic. The series showcases the story of an unusual family of ghosts who adopt a boy named Pinaki and raise him as one of their own. The series is produced by Tavrohi Animations. The lyrics for the title track of the series are written by poet and lyricist Gulzar, and the music is created by Simaab Sen. It premiered on 9 November 2020.

Synopsis 
In the beautiful town of Modern City in India, there is a haunted house named Vibhooti Mansion. What's not known to the people is that there is an eleven year old human kid named Pinaki who lives among the ghosts. As a baby, Pinaki was found on the doorstep of the mansion, along with a note that he must be protected by the people who live in it.

The family of ghosts, Col. Chiku Suri is the head of the family with his lovely wife, Bubbly Suri, who loves to cook some odd dishes, Happy as a Big Brother to Pinaki and Gappu as a cute-little-talking-dog. The ghost family adopt Pinaki and raise him as one of their own. Time flies, all these years Pinaki has been kept within the safe boundaries of the mansion until one day things take a turn when the protagonist decides to step out to see the outside world and pursue further education in Modern City's famous public school. The family has no choice but to come out of the haunted house for the first time in a decade. Thus begins the spooky adventures of Pinaki and his ghost family followed by a series of fun and slapstick comedy as they try to fit in the outside world. Pinaki ends up resolving all their conflicts with the humans and balancing all the time keeping his family's hidden identity intact.

Cast 
 Sonal Kaushal as Pinaki
 Rajesh Kava as Happy
 Manoj Pandey as Col. Chiku Suri
 Aranya Kaur as Bubbly Suri
 Pawan Kalra as Dheeru Sir & Principal Sir 
 Meghana Erande as Gappu
 Bhakti Jhaveri as Dimpy
 Pooja Punjabi as Sohail
 Samarth Korde (S - 1), Asmita Dabhole (S - 2) as Chintu
 Saudamini as Mintu
 Rajesh Shukla as Shantu

Characters

Main characters
 Pinaki- He is an eleven-year-old smart, and well-learned kid, who has been brought up by his unusual family of ghosts. Things take a turn when he gets admission to a local school and interacts with humans. Pinaki is also a bit naughty and generally works towards making things go in his favor. He tries his best to balance his life between school and his family of ghosts. He is very attentive in class and scores well at school. He is his teacher's favorite.
 Happy- He is like an elder brother to Pinaki. They both have a very friendly equation. He is the youngest and funniest ghost in the family, almost like Johnny Bravo. He is 18 years old. He is an over-the-top, dramatic teen. Most of the time his silly mistakes end up escalating the problems. He loves singing and speaks funny one-liners, cracks jokes, and makes everyone laugh.
 Gappu- The pet dog of Col. Suri. Ever since he became a ghost, he realized that he could talk like humans. He is a scientist at heart and loves to invent new Bhootiya (Ghostly) gadgets to help himself and the family.
 Col. Vibhuti Suri- He is the senior-most ghost of the family. He takes decisions and maintains discipline in the mansion like any Army colonel. However, when it comes to the reputation of the family or ghost community or the safety of one of his own, he can bend the rules and go all out. His mummy calls him Chikoo.
 Mrs. Babli Suri / Aunty Suri- She is the wife of Col. Suri. She is very firm and strong in nature, yet too kind towards our protagonist Pinaki. She loves him from her soul. She loves to cook and thinks she is a great cook. She likes to cook some odd dishes that generally taste bad. Everyone is scared of her cooking, as she keeps inventing weird recipes.

Supporting characters
 Shantu- He is another one of Pinaki's classmates. He is a snarky kid and a bully as well. He loves to pick on Pinaki because after his admission of his school, he loses his first spot in sports and games, and since then, he has developed a grudge and tries to be troublesome to him, which always goes awry.
 Chintu and Mintu- They are the sidekicks of Shantu. They feed him information that he needs and they also support him. They also execute his devious antics. Mintu is the one who encounters paranormal activity most of the time, but no one believes him, not even his twin brother, Chintu.
 Dheeru Sir- He is Pinaki's class teacher. He is middle aged and speaks with a Bihari accent. He is a bit laid back about everything. He is fond of Pinaki. He also makes funny sounds when he falls asleep.
 Sohail- He is one of Pinaki's classmates and his best friend. He is also scared of things sometimes, but whenever the kids are in  trouble or feel like things don't go their way, he starts talking very fast, extremely fast.
 Dimpy- She is also one of Pinaki's classmates and his best friend. She is one of the most courageous girls anyone can come across and is always up for an adventure.

Other characters
 Principal Sir- He is the principal of Pinaki's school.
Aisha- She is the elder sister of Sohail. She is a detective.
 Miss Meeti- She is the science teacher of Pinaki's school. When Shantu makes disturbance in her classes, she gives him big punishments, such as write an esay on Rocket and Shantu's Mom, in 2999 words, make experiments 1099 times!
Cap Uncle - He is a fake real estate agent. He fakes others by telling to rent the house. He is an enemy of Pinaki and his bhoot family. He always tries to destroy Vibhooti Mansion. But he could not do that because he was failed by Pinaki.
Naani - She is a Mrs Suri's Mother Ghost. She hates Pinaki in the beginning. Later She realizes his kindness and forgiveness and supports him.
Bhoot Baby - He is a Mrs Suri's Friend's Baby Ghost. He uses bhoot power and gives trouble to Pinaki, Happy and Gappu.

Broadcast 
The series has been aired on Nickelodeon Sonic since November 2020. It has entered the Top 10 of the kids' category.

List of Episodes

References

External links
 
 Official website (Nickelodeon Sonic)

2020 Indian television series debuts
Animated television series about children
Indian children's animated comedy television series
Indian computer-animation
Indian television spin-offs
Nickelodeon (Indian TV channel) original programming
Hindi-language Nickelodeon original programming